The Holland Civic Center Place is a 2,000-seat multi-purpose event center located in Holland, Michigan, United States. It hosts local sporting events, recreation programming, public expos and concerts/live entertainment.  The venue can also be rented for private events such as corporate luncheons, wedding receptions, expos/tradeshows, and many other uses.

External links
Arena info on City of Holland, Michigan website
Holland Civic Center website

Basketball venues in Michigan
Buildings and structures in Holland, Michigan
Buildings and structures in Ottawa County, Michigan